Riverhead is a town in Suffolk County, New York, United States, on the north shore of Long Island. Since 1727, Riverhead has been the county seat of Suffolk County, though most county offices are in Hauppauge. As of the 2020 census, the population was 35,902.  The town rests on the mouth of the Peconic River, from which it derives its name. The smaller hamlet of Riverhead lies within it, and is the town's principal economic center. The town is 166 miles (267 km) southwest of Boston via the Orient Point-New London Ferry, and is 76 miles (123 km) northeast of New York City.

In the beginning of the 20th century, the town saw an influx of Polish immigrants. This led to the creation of Polish Town, a section of the Town and County seat where the popular Polish Town Fair is held annually.

Riverhead is the agricultural apex of Long Island, with 20,000 of the 35,000 acres of the island's farmland located within the town. The town is also home to four separate beaches which are open year round. Iron Pier, Wading River, and Reeves Beach each offer boating access for residents and visitors alike.

History 
European colonists purchased the "Southold land" from the local Algonquian-speaking Native Americans and Shinnecock Indian Nation in 1649.  An additional portion was purchased from Col. William Smith and divided among settlers in 1742.

The town of Riverhead was created in 1792 as part of new jurisdictions after the American Revolution.  The New York State Legislature divided it from the town of Southold, New York, which lies to the north and east. Riverhead was separated at the behest of its inhabitants, who "represented to the Legislature that their town is so long that it is very inconvenient for them [people of western regions of Southold] to attend at  town meetings, and also to transact the other necessary business of the said town, and have prayed that the same may be divided into two towns". The poor western sections of Southold, with no harbor and little commerce, were thus divided. On March 13, 1792, the Legislature passed a bill splitting off this section under the name River Head. The new enclave's first town meeting was scheduled to be held April 3, 1792.

River Head was named the county seat of Suffolk County (called a "county town" at the time), and its name was later combined as Riverhead.

By 1902, its approximate population was 2,500.

Geography
The northern town line is delineated by Long Island Sound, with Connecticut on the opposite shore.  The eastern town line is the border of the town of Southold.  The town is partly on the North Fork of the county. The eastern terminus of the Long Island Expressway is in Riverhead.

Climate
Long Island has one of the northernmost humid subtropical climates (Köppen Cfa) in the United States.

Demographics

As of the census of 2010, there were 13,506 people and 15,424 households residing in the town.  The population density was 497.1 people per square mile (192.0/km2).

As of the census of 2000, There were 10,749 households, out of which 28.1% had children under the age of 18 living with them, 54.0% were married couples living together, 10.3% had a female householder with no husband present, and 32.2% were non-families. 26.4% of all households were made up of individuals, and 14.1% had someone living alone who was 65 years of age or older.  The average household size was 2.50 and the average family size was 3.01.

As of the census of 2010, in the town the population was spread out, with 20.4% under the age of 18, 2.2% from 18 to 20, 6.1% from 20 to 24, 10.5% from 25 to 34, 20.6% from 35 to 49, 21.8% from 49 to 64, and 19.4% who were 65 years of age or older. For every 100 females, there were 99.0 males.

As of the census of 2000, the median income for a household in the town was $52,195, and the median income for a family was $60,939. Males had a median income of $40,855 versus $32,288 for females. The per capita income for the town was $24,647.  About 15.8% of families and 17.9% of the population were below the poverty line, including 20.7% of those under age 18 and 7.4% of those age 65 or over.

Notable people 
Danny Burawa (born 1988), major league baseball pitcher.
Joseph McCrum Belford (August 5, 1852 - May 3, 1917) - Born in Mifflintown, Pennsylvania.  Republican member of the United States House of Representatives from New York- 1st. District, 1897 - 1899
Ed Danowski (September 30, 1911 - February 1, 1997) - Quarterback and Halfback in the NFL, Played for the New York Giants, 1934-1938, 1941. Quarterbacked Giants when they won the 1934 & 1938 NFL Championship Games.
Gen. Edmund Fanning (April 24, 1739 - February 28, 1818) - Loyalist and Lieutenant-Governor of Nova Scotia, 1783-1786
Garfield M. Langhorn (September 10, 1948 - January 15, 1969) - Medal of Honor recipient for his actions in the Vietnam War.
Scott Merserau (April 8, 1965) - Defensive end with the New York Jets, 1987-1993.
Otis Grey Pike (August 31, 1921 - January 20, 2014) - Democratic member of the United States House of Representatives from New York - 1st. District, 1961 - 1979
Anne C. Richard (born 1960) - Assistant Secretary of State for Population, Refugees, and Migration, 2012-2017.
Alexander M. Zaleski (June 24, 1906 - May 16, 1975) - Roman Catholic  Bishop of Lansing, 1965-1975.

Government and politics

Riverhead has a town council government. There is an elected Town Supervisor who is elected by the entire town, and four "at large" Town Council seats. The Town Supervisor term is for two years and four years for council seats. From 1956 to 1975, the Town Council consisted of the Town Supervisor, two Town Council members and two Justices of the Peace.  Prior to 1956, the Town Council consisted of the Town Supervisor and four Justices of the Peace. As of 2016, there is a 12 year term limit for Town Council members and the Town Supervisor. The Town Supervisor term of office is for two years. Members of the board cannot serve 12 consecutive years. That means that they could take a break after serving their 12 years and then run for office once again.

Media
The Riverhead newspaper Riverhead News-Review, dates back to 1950, when the Harry Lee Publishing Co. Inc, publishers of  The County Review (1903–1950), purchased The Riverhead News (1868–1950) and consolidated the two newspapers as The News-Review.  Times/Review Newspapers Corp. purchased The News-Review  and  The Suffolk Times, based in Greenport, in 1977.

The news website RiverheadLOCAL began publication in 2010. It is owned by East End Local Media Corp., an independent company based in Riverhead.

Communities and locations

Hamlets (unincorporated) 
 Aquebogue
 Baiting Hollow
 Calverton (small part in the Town of Brookhaven)
 Jamesport
 Laurel (partially, with the Town of Southold)
 Manorville (mostly in Brookhaven)
 Northville
 Riverhead (hamlet)
 Wading River (small part in Brookhaven)

Other communities 
 Centerville
 Polishtown
 Reeves Park
 Roanoke
 South Jamesport
 Sweyze

State parks 
 Hallock State Park Preserve
 Wildwood State Park
 Indian Island County Park

Transportation

Railroad lines
The Long Island Rail Road's Main Line is the sole line within the Town of Riverhead. The only active station is Riverhead, which is also used as the western terminus of the Railroad Museum of Long Island.

Bus service
The Town of Riverhead is served primarily by Suffolk County Transit and Hampton Jitney bus routes.

Major roads

 Interstate 495 – New York
 New York State Route 25A  – Stony Brook University
 New York State Route 25 – New York, Orient Point
 County Route 58 (Suffolk County, New York)
 County Route 105 (Suffolk County, New York)
Sound Avenue

Airports
The town of Riverhead contains a minor private-use airport known as the Calverton Executive Airpark, originally the Naval Weapons Industrial Reserve Plant, Calverton.

See also
National Register of Historic Places listings in Riverhead (town), New York

Footnotes

References
 Town of Riverhead official site

External links

 Riverhead Central School District
 Taussig, Charles William, The Book of Radio (1922), Chapter XXI "The World's Greatest Radio Station", pp. 312–327

 
County seats in New York (state)
Towns on Long Island
Towns in Suffolk County, New York
Towns in the New York metropolitan area
Populated coastal places in New York (state)